Rattana Petch-Aporn (born July 15, 1982), simply known as Na, is a Thai retired professional footballer who played as a defensive midfielder. He was also a member of the Thailand national team.

International career

In September, 2012 Rattana was called up in a friendly match against Laos

International

International goals

Honours

Buriram 
 Thai Division 1 League: 2011
Ratchaburi
 Thai Division 1 League: 2012

References

External links
 Profile at Goal

1982 births
Living people
Rattana Petch-Aporn
Rattana Petch-Aporn
Rattana Petch-Aporn
Rattana Petch-Aporn
Rattana Petch-Aporn
Rattana Petch-Aporn
Rattana Petch-Aporn
Rattana Petch-Aporn
Rattana Petch-Aporn
Rattana Petch-Aporn
Rattana Petch-Aporn
Association football midfielders